WNH may refer to:

WNH, the IATA code for Wenshan Puzhehei Airport, Yunnan Province, China
WNH, the National Rail station code for Warnham railway station, West Sussex, England
We're No Heroes, a Welsh three-piece band
Wednesday Night Heroes, a defunct Canadian punk rock band